Yarygino is a rural locality (a village) in Zhityovskoye Rural Settlement, Syamzhensky District, Vologda Oblast, Russia. The population was 3 as of 2002.

Geography 
Yarygino is located 17 km south of Syamzha (the district's administrative centre) by road. Sobolikha is the nearest rural locality.

References 

Rural localities in Syamzhensky District
Kadnikovsky Uyezd